Naa Ninna Preethisuve is a 1986 Indian Kannada film,  directed by Somu-Shankar and produced by Manjula Shankar. The film stars V. Ravichandran, Bhavya, Arjun Sarja and M. P. Shankar in the lead roles. The film has musical score by Shankar–Ganesh.

Cast

V. Ravichandran
Bhavya
Arjun Sarja
Shankar Nag in special appearance
Srinath in special appearance
M. P. Shankar
C. R. Simha
Ramesh Bhat
M. S. Karanth
Suresh
Ashok
K. Vijaya
Uma Shivakumar
Sarvamangala
Lalithamma
Sathyabhama
V. Ramachandru
Chenna
Shankar
Honnavalli Krishna
Meese Krishna
Ravi
Hubli Gowda
Prakash
C. Anand
Chikkanna
Munirangappa
Master Chethan
Baby Gayithri

References

External links
 
 

1986 films
1980s Kannada-language films
Films scored by Shankar–Ganesh